Grotella margueritaria is a moth in the genus Grotella, of the family Noctuidae. The species was first described by André Blanchard in 1968. This moth species is found in North America, including Texas, its type location.

References

External links
Insect species described from Big Bend National Park, Texas

Grotella
Moths described in 1968